Alucita zonodactyla is a moth of the family Alucitidae. It is found in France, Spain, Italy, Croatia and Greece. It has also been recorded from Turkey and Russia.

The wingspan is 15–18 mm. Adults are on wing from late July to October in one generation per year.

References

External links

Images representing  Alucita zonodactyla at Consortium for the Barcode of Life

Moths described in 1847
Alucitidae
Moths of Europe
Moths of Asia
Taxa named by Philipp Christoph Zeller